Xiangshan Subdistrict is a subdistrict situated on the western portion of Haidian District, Beijing, China. It borders Wenquan and Xibeiwan Towns in its north, Qinglongqiao Subdistrict in its east, Sijiqing Town and Wulituo Subdistrict in its south, and Junzhuang Town in its west. In 2020, it had 27,614 inhabitants under its administration.

This subdistrict got its name from Xiangshan (Fragrant Hills) in the subdistrict. The name derives from the highest peak of Fragrant Hills, Xianglu Feng (Incense Burner Peak), a  hill with two large stones resembling incense burners at the top.

History

Administrative Divisions 
As of 2021, there were 6 residential communities in Xiangshan Subdistrict:

Transport 
 Fragrant Hills station
 China National Botanical Garden station

See also 
 List of township-level divisions of Beijing

References 

Haidian District
Subdistricts of Beijing